Sphinx was a 64-gun ship of the line of the French Navy, lead ship of her class. She was designed by Pierre Salinoc from 1752 to 1755 and fought in several engagements of the Seven Years' War before being broken up in 1775 and replaced by another 64 gun ship of the same name.

References

Ships of the line of the French Navy
1755 ships